Ralph Tatham (bap. 1778–1857) was an English academic and churchman.

Life
He graduated at the University of Cambridge in 1803. He became Master of St John's College, Cambridge, Public Orator (1809–1839), and Vice-Chancellor(1839–1840). He was also Rector (1816–1857) of Colkirk, Norfolk.

References

External links
 The Tathams of County Durham

1770s births
1857 deaths
19th-century English Anglican priests
Masters of St John's College, Cambridge
Vice-Chancellors of the University of Cambridge
Cambridge University Orators